Bruce Anthony Berry (August 3, 1950 – June 4, 1973) was a professional roadie for the members of Crosby, Stills, Nash & Young, both as a group and individually.

His brother was Jan Berry of the musical duo Jan and Dean. His father worked with Howard Hughes on the Spruce Goose.

He got his start by working at his brother Ken's store Studio Instrument Rentals (S.I.R.) which brought him steady gigs. His happy, charismatic personality endeared him to the group and he was often on the road with them. He used to load all of his instruments into his trademark white Ford Econoline van, until he moved to England to work with Stephen Stills.

When he returned to the United States, he was a completely different person. Danny Whitten of Crazy Horse had introduced him to heroin and it now controlled his life. Berry died of an overdose of heroin and cocaine on June 4, 1973, just a few months after Whitten met the same fate. Berry's story was later used as the theme of the lyrics of the title track from Tonight's the Night by Neil Young.

References

External links 
 Bruce Berry bio

1950 births
1973 deaths
Road crew
Deaths by heroin overdose in California
People from Los Angeles
Cocaine-related deaths in California